The Chenab Rail Bridge is a steel and concrete arch bridge between Bakkal and Kauri and just 42 km from main Reasi town in the Reasi district of Jammu and Kashmir, India. In November 2017, the base supports were declared completed allowing for the start of the construction of the main arch. The bridge was fully completed and was inaugurated in August 2022.

In April 2021, the Chenab Rail Bridge's arch was completed and the overall bridge was completed in August 2022. It is expected to open to rail traffic in December 2022.

Key technical data of the bridge include:
 Deck height (height above river bed): , (height above river surface):  
 Arch span: 
 Arch length: 

This makes the Chenab Rail Bridge: 
 The world's highest railway bridge
 The bridge with the longest span in the  broad gauge railway network

Introduction and topography
Northern Railway has undertaken the megaproject of constructing a new railway line across the Indian union territory of Jammu and Kashmir between the towns of Udhampur near Jammu and Baramulla on the northwestern edge of the Kashmir Valley. This project was declared a national project in 2002. It is directed by the Northern Railway.

The extraordinary challenge lies in a large number of tunnels (totaling 63 km in length) and bridges (7.5 km) to be implemented in highly rugged and mountainous terrain, with the difficult Himalayan geology. The most difficult part is believed to be the crossing of the deep gorge of the Chenab River, near Salal Hydro Power Dam, by the Chenab Bridge.

This proposal was abandoned by the railway due to the specific geology of the location and a cable-stayed bridge is proposed which will be Indian Railways first cable stayed bridge.

Design
After many deliberations, taking into account aesthetics, economy, and availability of local expertise and construction materials, the Chenab Rail Bridge was designed as a large span single arch steel bridge with approach viaducts on either side. The arch is two-ribbed, fabricated from large steel trusses. The chords of the trusses are sealed steel boxes, internally stiffened and filled with concrete to assist in controlling wind-induced forces on the bridge. Another advantage of concrete filling is that internal painting will not be required.

The number of bearings has been minimized, particularly on the approach viaduct, through the use of continuous construction. This is advantageous, as it reduces the maintenance and inspection efforts, and improves the riding quality. The viaduct piers are of concrete, while the piers near the arch are 
Indian construction standards such as the Indian Railway Standards (IRS), the Indian Road Congress (IRC) and the Indian Standards (IS) were found inadequate for the large spans of the Chenab Bridge. For example, the Indian Railway Standards (IRS) is primarily intended for simply supported bridges with spans up to 100m (although these have been successfully used for higher spans up to 154m). The spans for the Chenab Rail Bridge greatly exceed this limit, and are continuous. Therefore, to assure a safe design, Indian national standards have been supplemented with International standards such as British Standards (BS), International Union of Railways (UIC) and Euro. Also, many global experts with versatile and relevant experience, have been involved in order to facilitate making the project a success.

Following are some of the design considerations taken into account:
 Limit state philosophy of design has been decided to be followed as per BS codes
 Computation of wind load effects as per wind tunnel tests
 Site specific seismic spectra developed by Indian Institute of Technology (IIT) Roorkee
 Provision of Euro code 8 for ductility detailing of very tall and hollow rectangular RCC piers
 Provision of long welded rail (LWR) over the bridges and resulting force calculation as per UIC – 774-3R guidelines
 Blast resistant design used
 Design checking for fatigue as per BS codes
 Deformation limits as per comfort criteria of UIC – 776-2R and UIC 776 -3R guidelines
 Redundancy provided in the structures, for lower level of operation during mishaps and against collapse in extreme cases of one pier failure

The quality aspect has been emphasised, as the quantum of fabrication and welding is colossal. Mostly indigenous material compliant to IS codes has been planned to be used, whereas for the design, international codes have been referred, which means the Quality Control work is still difficult.

Construction
The Chenab Rail Bridge was originally intended to be completed in December 2009. However, in September 2008, the project was halted due to fears over the bridge's stability and safety. Work on the bridge restarted in 2010, with the plan to complete it in 2015.

The design and construction was awarded to Afcons Infrastructure, a part of the Shapoorji Pallonji Group, the third-largest construction group in India, with the help of IISc Bangalore. Major construction decisions were taken by Konkan Railway Corporation. The Defence Research and Development Organisation (DRDO) helped in the design of the bridge, making it blast-proof using special steel.

The erection scheme for the bridge is a project in itself. Two pylons (about 130 m and 100 m high) were erected on either side of the river, and two auxiliary self-propelled cable cranes (capacity of 20 tonnes each) were used to tow temporary auxiliary ropes across these pylons. The ropes were used to support the partly finished arch parts. After arch completion, the trusses will be added, finally the girder will be constructed as a horizontal sliding type platform.

Project status

 Dec 2003: Project approved.
 Feb 2008: Contract awarded for construction.
 Aug 2010: Construction restarted. 
 Jul 2017: Construction work resumed on the bridge.
 Nov 2017: The work bridge's arch is expected to be completed by May 2019.
 Nov 2018: The bridge is now under active construction.
 Dec 2018: The project was expected to be completed by the end of 2019, but at this time, it seems unlikely.
 Aug 2019: 80% of construction work has been completed on the bridge, and is expected to be opened in mid-2020.
 Nov 2019: 83% work has been completed on the bridge, and is now expected to be opened in March 2021.
 Jan 2020: It is now expected to be opened in December 2021.
 Apr 2021: Work on both the ends of the bridge's arch is finally completed. It is now expected to be opened in 2022.
 Jun 2022: About 90% of construction work has been completed, and is now confirmed to make the bridge operational by December 2022.
 Aug 2022: The bridge's remaining work on the final joint was completed, and was inaugurated on 13 August 2022.
 Feb 2023: Track Laying starts.

Maintenance
Regular painting of large bridges is an intimidating task; hence, a painting scheme was developed, having renewal of over 15 years, compared to approx. 5 to 7 years in most other Indian railway bridges.

See also
 
 
 Anji Khad Bridge
 Geostrategic rail lines in India
 India-China Border Roads
 List of bridges in India
 Tourism in India

References

External links 

Video simulation of the construction process
Report on bridge's progress including photo, June 2012

Bridges in Jammu and Kashmir
Bridges over the Chenab River
Reasi district
Bridges completed in 2022
Railway bridges in India